Darkabad (also Romanized as Darkābād) is a village in Shurab-e Tangazi Rural District, in the Central District of Kuhrang County, Chaharmahal and Bakhtiari Province, Iran. At the 2006 census, its population was 43, in 11 families.

References 

Populated places in Kuhrang County